Savennes is a commune in the Creuse department in the Nouvelle-Aquitaine region in central France.

Geography

Population

Sights
 A twentieth-century chapel.
 A restored public washhouse.

See also
Communes of the Creuse department

References

External links

 Savennes on the Quid website 

Communes of Creuse